The 2021 Orléans Masters was a badminton tournament which took place at Palais des Sports in France from 23 to 28 March 2021 and had a total purse of $75,000.

Tournament 
The 2021 Orléans Masters was the first Super 100 tournament of the 2021 BWF World Tour and also part of the Orléans Masters championships, which had been held since 2012. This tournament was organized by the Cercle Laïque des Tourelles Orléans (CLTO) Badminton and sanctioned by the BWF.

Venue 
This international tournament was held at Palais des Sports in Orléans, Centre-Val de Loire, France.

Point distribution 
Below is the point distribution table for each phase of the tournament based on the BWF points system for the BWF Tour Super 100 event.

Prize money 
The total prize money for this tournament was US$75,000. Distribution of prize money was in accordance with BWF regulations.

Men's singles

Seeds 

 Srikanth Kidambi (quarter-finals)
 Kantaphon Wangcharoen (withdrew)
 Hans-Kristian Vittinghus (semi-finals)
 Kunlavut Vitidsarn (semi-finals)
 Parupalli Kashyap (second round)
 Sitthikom Thammasin (withdrew)
 Prannoy Kumar (second round)
 Khosit Phetpradab (withdrew)

Finals

Top half

Section 1

Section 2

Bottom half

Section 3

Section 4

Women's singles

Seeds 

 Pornpawee Chochuwong (semi-finals)
 Mia Blichfeldt (withdrew)
 Busanan Ongbamrungphan (champion)
 Saina Nehwal (semi-finals)
 Evgeniya Kosetskaya (withdrew)
 Gregoria Mariska Tunjung (withdrew)
 Yvonne Li (first round)
 Neslihan Yiğit (withdrew)

Finals

Top half

Section 1

Section 2

Bottom half

Section 3

Section 4

Men's doubles

Seeds 

 Marcus Ellis / Chris Langridge (withdrew)
 Kim Astrup / Anders Skaarup Rasmussen (withdrew)
 Vladimir Ivanov / Ivan Sozonov (withdrew)
 Ben Lane / Sean Vendy (champions)
 Mark Lamsfuß / Marvin Seidel (withdrew)
 Jones Ralfy Jansen / Peter Käsbauer (quarter-finals)
 Arjun M.R. / Dhruv Kapila (quarter-finals)
 Mathias Christiansen / Niclas Nøhr (second round)

Finals

Top half

Section 1

Section 2

Bottom half

Section 3

Section 4

Women's doubles

Seeds 

 Jongkolphan Kititharakul / Rawinda Prajongjai (champions)
 Gabriela Stoeva / Stefani Stoeva (final)
 Chloe Birch / Lauren Smith (quarter-finals)
 Maiken Fruergaard / Sara Thygesen (quarter-finals)
 Émilie Lefel / Anne Tran (withdrew)
 Selena Piek / Cheryl Seinen (semi-finals)
 Linda Efler / Isabel Herttrich (withdrew)
 N. Sikki Reddy / Ashwini Ponnappa (semi-finals)

Finals

Top half

Section 1

Section 2

Bottom half

Section 3

Section 4

Mixed doubles

Seeds 

 Marcus Ellis / Lauren Smith (withdrew)
 Goh Soon Huat / Shevon Jemie Lai (withdrew)
 Thom Gicquel / Delphine Delrue (withdrew)
 Chris Adcock / Gabby Adcock (withdrew)
 Mark Lamsfuß / Isabel Herttrich (withdrew)
 Robin Tabeling / Selena Piek (withdrew)
 Mathias Christiansen / Alexandra Bøje (champions)
 Rodion Alimov / Alina Davletova (withdrew)

Finals

Top half

Section 1

Section 2

Bottom half

Section 3

Section 4

References

External links 
Tournament link

Orléans Masters
Orléans Masters
Orléans Masters
Orléans Masters